Srebarna Glacier on Livingston Island in the South Shetland Islands, Antarctica is situated east-northeast of Boyana Glacier, southeast of the head of Macy Glacier and southwest of Magura Glacier. It extends 2.3 km in southwest-northeast direction and 1.8 km in northwest-southeast direction, and drains southeast of Serdica Peak and the Great Needle Peak in Levski Ridge, Tangra Mountains to enter Bransfield Strait between Aytos Point and M'Kean Point.

The glacier is named after Srebarna Lake in northeastern Bulgaria.

Location
Bulgarian mapping in 2005 and 2009.

See also
 List of glaciers in the Antarctic
 Glaciology

Maps
 L.L. Ivanov et al. Antarctica: Livingston Island and Greenwich Island, South Shetland Islands. Scale 1:100000 topographic map. Sofia: Antarctic Place-names Commission of Bulgaria, 2005.
 L.L. Ivanov. Antarctica: Livingston Island and Greenwich, Robert, Snow and Smith Islands. Scale 1:120000 topographic map.  Troyan: Manfred Wörner Foundation, 2009.

References
 Srebarna Glacier SCAR Composite Antarctic Gazetteer
 Bulgarian Antarctic Gazetteer. Antarctic Place-names Commission. (details in Bulgarian, basic data in English)

External links
 Srebarna Glacier. Copernix satellite image

Glaciers of Livingston Island